The Red Turtle is a 2016 animated fantasy drama film co-written and directed by Dutch animator Michaël Dudok de Wit and produced by Toshio Suzuki from Japan. The film is a co-production between Studio Ghibli and several French companies, including Wild Bunch, and tells the story of a man who becomes shipwrecked on an uninhabited island and meets a giant red female turtle. The film has no dialogue. It premiered in the Un Certain Regard section at the 2016 Cannes Film Festival. The film was nominated for the Best Animated Feature Film for the 89th Academy Awards.

Plot 
A man set adrift by a storm wakes up on a beach. He discovers that he is on an uninhabited island with plenty of fresh water, fruit and a dense bamboo forest. It is dominated by a smooth rock hill. After a few nights he begins to hallucinate, firstly seeing a string quartet playing on the beach. He builds a raft from bamboo and attempts to sail away, but his raft is destroyed by an unseen monster in the sea, forcing him back to the island. He tries again with a larger raft, but is again foiled by the creature. A third attempt ends with the raft destroyed but this time he is confronted by a giant turtle with a bright red shell.

That evening, the man sees the red turtle crawling up the beach. In anger, he hits it on the head with a bamboo stick, then flips it over onto its back, stranding it. While working on another raft, he feels remorse and returns to the turtle but it is too heavy for him to flip over. He fetches water for it, but when he returns, it is dead. He falls asleep next to it. In the morning, the man is surprised to find a red-haired woman lying unconscious inside the shell, which has split. He fetches water for her and builds a shelter to protect her from the sun. When rain hits, the woman wakes up and goes swimming. The woman casts the shell adrift on the sea and the man does the same to his raft. The two fall in love.

The couple have a red-haired son. The curious boy finds a glass bottle and his father and mother tell him their story. After accidentally falling into the sea, the boy learns he is a natural swimmer, and swims with three green turtles. He swims back to his mother, who hugs him and looks out at the sea with apprehension. The boy grows into a young man. One day, a tsunami hits, destroying most of the bamboo forest and separating the family. 

After the tsunami recedes, the young man searches for his parents and finds his mother wounded with no sign of his father. He swims out to sea and is joined by three turtles. We see the father clinging to a large bamboo tree. Just as he slips under the water they arrive and rescue him. The young man also finds his glass bottle, and the family clean up the wreckage and burn the dead bamboo.

One day the young man has a dream about swimming away into the sea. The water becomes static, allowing him to swim to the top of a huge wave, from where he can see a larger bit of land. He says goodbye to his parents and swims away with the three green turtles. The man and woman continue to live on the island and grow old together, still very much in love. One night, after gazing at the moon, the man closes his eyes and dies. The woman grieves. She lies next to him, and lays her hand on his. Her hand transforms into a flipper and she is transformed back into  the red turtle, she crawls down the beach and swims away.

Production
The film was co-produced by Wild Bunch and Studio Ghibli in association with Why Not Productions, along with funding and support from Prima Linea Productions, Arte France Cinéma, CN4 Productions, and Belvision in France, and Nippon Television Network, Dentsu, Hakudodo DY Media Partners, Walt Disney Japan, Mitsubishi Corporation, and Toho in Japan. According to Vincent Maraval, head of Wild Bunch, he visited Studio Ghibli in Japan in 2008 and met with Hayao Miyazaki. Miyazaki showed him the short film Father and Daughter and asked him to find its director, Michaël Dudok de Wit, with the prospect of co-producing a feature film. Wild Bunch approached Dudok de Wit in London and convinced him to take on the project. The screenplay was written by Dudok de Wit and Pascale Ferran.

Release
The film had its world premiere on 18 May at the 2016 Cannes Film Festival, where it competed in the Un Certain Regard section. On 13 June, it was screened as the opening film of the 2016 Annecy International Animated Film Festival. The regular French release was 29 June 2016.

It was released in Japan on 17 September 2016, by Toho. The movie was released on DVD and Blu-Ray by Walt Disney Japan through the Ghibli Ga Ippai label on March 17, 2017, with the Blu-Ray version also containing Michaël Dudok de Wit's other short films.

In May 2016, Sony Pictures Classics acquired the North and Latin American distribution rights for the film and was released in the United States on 20 January 2017.

The Red Turtle was played in the London Film Festival on 5 October 2016 and eventually released in the United Kingdom by StudioCanal on 26 May 2017.

Reception

Critical response
The Red Turtle received critical acclaim. On review aggregator website Rotten Tomatoes, the film has a 93% score based on 169 reviews, with an average of 8.1/10. The site's critical consensus reads, "The Red Turtle adds to Studio Ghibli's estimable legacy with a beautifully animated effort whose deceptively simple story boasts narrative layers as richly absorbing as its lovely visuals." Metacritic reports an 86 out of 100 rating, based on 32 reviews, indicating "universal acclaim".

In Japan it was released in theaters on 17 September and grossed a total of $328,750 during its first weekend.

Accolades

References

External links

  
  
  
 
 
 
 
 
 Official screenplay

2016 films
2016 animated films
2016 directorial debut films
Belgian animated films
Belgian animated fantasy films
2010s French animated films
French animated fantasy films
Japanese animated films
Japanese animated fantasy films
Annie Award winners
Magritte Award winners
Animated films about turtles
Films about castaways
Animated films set on islands
Films set on uninhabited islands
Animated films without speech
Magic realism films
Metaphysical fiction films
Films directed by Michaël Dudok de Wit
Toho animated films
Studio Ghibli animated films
Sony Pictures Classics animated films
2010s American films